Soho Road railway station was a railway station in Handsworth, Birmingham, England, on the London and North Western Railway's rail link between the Chase Line and the West Coast Main Line. The station operated between 1889 and 1941.

The station never attracted many passengers, as it competed with the nearby Great Western Railway station , which was on a more direct route to Birmingham. Like neighbouring station Handsworth Wood, it was closed as an economy measure during the Second World War, and never re-opened. The line however still operates today.

A short distance to the south-east of the station was a short spur, which led to Soho Pool goods station.

References

Disused railway stations in Birmingham, West Midlands
Railway stations in Great Britain opened in 1889
Railway stations in Great Britain closed in 1941
Former London and North Western Railway stations